Thomas Passhe (died 1489) was a Canon of Windsor from 1449 to 1489.

Career

He was appointed:
Prebendary of Minor Pars Altaris in Salisbury 1448
Sub-Almoner to the King

He was appointed to the tenth stall in St George's Chapel, Windsor Castle in 1449 and held the canonry until 1489.

Notes 

1489 deaths
Canons of Windsor
Year of birth unknown